Dulari Bibi is a 1933 Hindi/Urdu comedy film. It was directed by Debaki Bose and produced by New Theatres Ltd. Calcutta.  A short 3 reel film it centred on the story of Our Wives. The film starred K. L. Saigal, Molina Devi, Mir Jan and the music was composed by R. C. Boral. It was listening to K. L. Saigal in this film that Pahari Sanyal realised the uniqueness of Saigal's voice as heard through the microphone. He found it more effective, "sweeter", as compared to him singing live.

Cast
K. L. Saigal
Molina Devi
Mir Jan

References

External links

 Dulari Bibi (1933) on indiancine.ma

1933 films
1930s Hindi-language films
Indian black-and-white films
Indian comedy films
1933 comedy films
Hindi-language comedy films
[[Category:Films scored by R
 C. Boral]]